The 2016 Atlantic Coast Conference men's basketball tournament is the postseason men's basketball tournament for the Atlantic Coast Conference and was held at the Verizon Center in Washington D.C. from March 8–12, 2016. The winner of the tournament receives the conference's automatic bid to the 2016 NCAA tournament. The tournament included 14 of the 15 ACC teams due to Louisville's self-imposed postseason ban. This was the 20th consecutive ACC Tournament that featured Duke or UNC in the championship game.

Seeds
The top 10 teams received first round byes and the top 4 teams received double byes to the Quarterfinals.

Teams were seeded by record within the conference, with a tiebreaker system to seed teams with identical conference records.

Schedule

Bracket

* denotes overtime period

Awards and honors 
Tournament MVP: Joel Berry II, North Carolina

All-Tournament Teams:

First Team
 Joel Berry II, North Carolina
 Marcus Paige, North Carolina
 Malcolm Brogdon, Virginia
 Anthony Gill, Virginia
 Brice Johnson, North Carolina

Second Team
 London Perrantes, Virginia
 Sheldon McClellan, Miami
 Seth Allen, Virginia Tech
 Grayson Allen, Duke
 Zach Auguste, Notre Dame

See also
 2016 ACC women's basketball tournament

References

Tournament
ACC men's basketball tournament
College basketball tournaments in Washington, D.C.
ACC men's basketball tournament
ACC men's basketball tournament